"Cantaré, cantarás" (I Will Sing, You Will Sing) is a single by various Latin American icons called circumstantially "Hermanos", and it was released in 1985. The B-side is conformed by Herb Alpert's "African Flame". The song was considered as an LP and peaked number 12 in Billboard's Latin Pop Albums in September 1985.

Background 
"Cantaré, Cantarás" was recorded with the purpose of raising funds to boost the campaigns of the United Nations Children's Fund (UNICEF) in Latin America. Producers Albert Hammond, José Quintana, Manuel Montoya, Peter Lopez, Luis Medina, and Jose Behar, Co-Founders of non-profit organization HERMANOS, producers of "Cantare, Cantaras" were in charge of the project, bringing together more than 50 Spanish-speaking music artists. Recording was engineered by Humberto Gatica.

The project was inspired by the recording of USA For Africa "We Are The World" which had been recorded same year, 1985. Idea came about when Manuel Montoya, manager for Albert Hammond at the time, assigned the Lani Hall, A&M artist, also managed by Montoya, recording project later entitled, "Es Facil Amar", to Hammond. The Grammy Award winning effort contained collaborations by Roberto Carlos and Jose Feliciano. Hermanos non-profit organization set up an office in Burbank, CA and assigned Luis Medina to handle day to day operations for the group, authorized signatories were, Luis Medina, Peter, Lopez and Manuel Montoya. Recording took place in April 1985.

The LP/single is considered the Latin American version of "We Are the World". It was recorded in Los Angeles in April 1985, at A&M Studios Studios, the same studio used for "We Are the World".

It was composed by Albert Hammond, Juan Carlos Calderón and Anahí van Zandweghe,.

A behind the scenes special of making of the record was filmed in La Paz, Bolivia, hosted by Ricardo Montalban and executive produced by Luis Medina, Peter Lopez and Manuel Montoya.

Earnings were donated to UNICEF for distribution to charitable organizations in Latin America.

Music video 
The music video for "Cantaré, Cantarás" was recorded in the same location of "We Are The World".

Track listing

Personnel
Credits adapted from Cantaré, Cantarás (I Will Sing, You Will Sing) liner notes.

Vocals (in alphabetic order)

Fernando Allende
María Conchita Alonso
Apollonia Kotero
Ramón Arcusa
Basilio
Braulio
Cantinflas
Irene Cara
Roberto Carlos
Nydia Caro
Vikki Carr
Verónica Castro
Charytín
Chiquetete
Claudia de Colombia
Gal Costa
Celia Cruz
Lupita D'Alessio
Guillermo Dávila
Plácido Domingo
Emmanuel
Sergio Facheli
José Feliciano
Vicente Fernández
Miguel Gallardo
Lucho Gatica
Julio Iglesias
Antonio de Jesús
José José
Rocío Jurado
Lissette
Valeria Lynch
Cheech Marin
Sérgio Mendes
Lucía Méndez
Menudo (with Ricky Martin and Robi Draco Rosa, Roy Rossello, Raymond Acevedo and Charlie Masso, group members during 1985.)
Miami Sound Machine
Amanda Miguel
Ricardo Montalbán
Palito Ortega
Pimpinela (Lucía y Joaquín Galán)
Tony Renis
Danny Rivera
José Luis Rodríguez
Lalo Schifrin
Simone
Manoella Torres
Pedro Vargas
Diego Verdaguer
Yuri (Mexican singer)

Musicians
David Foster – keyboards, synthesizer
Greg Phillinganes – keyboard, synthesizer
John Robinson – drums
José Feliciano – spanish guitar
Nathan East – electric bass
Carlos Rios– guitar
Abraham Laboriel - (bass)

Charts

References 

Aid songs for Africa
All-star recordings
1985 singles
Charity singles
Songs written by Albert Hammond
Songs written by Juan Carlos Calderón
1985 songs